Botun is a village in the municipality of Debarca, North Macedonia. It used to be part of the former municipality of Belčišta.

Name
Bulgarian academic Georgiev derives the toponym Botun from the Romanian term buti (meaning spill or a current) and notes that in the Dicţionarul limbii romane (Romanian Dictionary) the term buti is marked as a loan from Bulgarian. Another Bulgarian academic derives the toponym Botun from the Romanian word boti (meaning wooden bucket or bucket). Botun lies on Sateska river, which forms a ravine and according to Pianka Włodzimierz the first explanation looks plausible. Pianka Włodzimierz however states that a more acceptable etymology of the village name is given by M. Moskov where Botun is derived from the Macedonian Botunja meaning fertile soil. In a similar way Włodzimierz notes that in the speech of Albanians from the nearby area of Debar the term botë exists referring to a kind of darken/ash coloured earth or land.

Demographics
According to the 2002 census, the village had a total of 227 inhabitants. Ethnic groups in the village include:

Macedonians 220
Serbs 3 
Others 4

References

External links

Villages in Debarca Municipality